The National Twelve-Bell Striking Contest is the principal change ringing striking competition in the United Kingdom. It has been held annually since 1975, and is open to any tower where 12-bell ringing is practised regularly. The winners of the competition are awarded the Taylor Trophy.

In recent years the competition has become more regimented; it is now common practice that eliminators are held in good time before each year's final, and that all teams must qualify in the eliminators to compete in the final (with the occasional exception of teams representing host towers). The eliminators are usually held in March, all on the same day, and the final is usually held on the fourth Saturday in June.

The 2006 competition was featured in the Marcus Brigstocke BBC television programme Trophy People.

Past Results

2015 competition
The final of the 2015 contest was held at St Peter Mancroft, Norwich on 27 June 2015.
The results of the final are listed below:

2014 competition
The final of the 2014 contest was held at Christ Church, Oxford and was won by Birmingham.

2013 competition

The final of the 2013 National Twelve-Bell Striking Contest was held at Ripon Cathedral, North Yorkshire on Saturday 22 June.
The results of the final are listed below:

The test piece for the 2013 final was six leads of Cambridge Surprise Maximus.

In a landmark move, the 2013 competition marked the first time that a live broadcast of the competition, including interviews with teams and judges, was streamed online for ringers around the world. It was hosted by the presenter and bellringer Matthew Tosh.

Previous winners

References

Competitions in the United Kingdom
1975 establishments in the United Kingdom
Recurring events established in 1975
Campanology
Annual events in the United Kingdom